Mike Lashuk (born 1939) is a former award winning fullback who played in the Canadian Football League for the Edmonton Eskimos from 1957 to 1963.

A native of Edmonton, Lashuk won the Dr. Beattie Martin Trophy for Canadian rookie of the year in the west in 1957, rushing for 164 yards and intercepting 2 passes. He played defensive back for a couple of seasons, with 5 interceptions in 1959 and 4 in 1960. He finally got his chance at fullback, teaming up with Eskimo legend Johnny Bright, rushing for 757 yards in 1961 and leading the team with 802 rushing yards in 1962. He retired after 7 seasons in 1963.

References

1939 births
Living people
Canadian Football League Rookie of the Year Award winners
Edmonton Elks players
Players of Canadian football from Alberta
Canadian football people from Edmonton